Qurbaghestan-e Olya (also Romanized as Qurbāghestān-e ‘Olyā; also known as Gherbaghestan, Gurbāghistān, Qarabāghestān-e Bālā, Qarbāghastān-e Bālā, Qorbāghestān, Qorbāghestān-e Bālā, and Qorbāghestān-e ‘Olyā) is a village in Qarah Su Rural District, in the Central District of Kermanshah County, Kermanshah Province, Iran. At the 2006 census, its population was 160, in 32 families.

References 

Populated places in Kermanshah County